The Ardal North Cup is a football knockout tournament involving teams who play in the tier 3 Ardal North East and North West Leagues, administered by the Football Association of Wales.

Competition history
The first season of the competition was meant to be the 2020–21 season but the competition was cancelled due to the Coronavirus pandemic. The 2021–22 season saw Caersws crowned as the competition's inaugural winners, beating Mold Alexandra.

Past winners

2020s

 2020–21: – No competition
 2021–22: – Caersws

Details of competition finals

Number of titles by winning clubs since 2020s

Caersws – 1 title

See also
Ardal South Cup, the corresponding cup for clubs from the two southern Ardal Leagues.

Notes and references

Football cup competitions in Wales
Football in Wales
Recurring sporting events established in 2020
2020 establishments in Wales